The Međimurje County Museum in Čakovec, the seat of Međimurje County, Croatia, is located in the Zrinski Castle inner palace, the biggest medieval fortification in the county, close to the centre of the town and its main square.

History
The museum was established in 1954 by the authorities of Međimurje County as Čakovec Town Museum and opened to the public in 1955. At the beginning it was housed in the exhibition halls inside the fortified outer buildings of the castle. Later it was enlarged, renamed and transferred to the three-storey inner palace of the castle complex, so it has around  today.

Function
The museum is a regional cultural heritage museum. It collects, preserves, maintains, displays, exhibits and interprets artifacts pertinent to the history of Međimurje County. It also gives expert help, guiding services and other informational services, organizes educational lectures and specialized exhibitions, publishes expert books and has other activities.

Departments and collections
Among the museum's exhibits are many local artifacts and archeological findings dating from prehistory to recent history (20th century). A series of rooms depicts different periods of history and include information boards. Themes covered include ethnographical heritage and the history of the local economy.

There are five departments in the museum aiming to promote the county's rich legacy of heritage, culture and arts: archeology, ethnography, cultural history, history and visual arts gallery. The last includes the memorial collection of Ladislav Kralj–Međimurec (1891–1976), a notable Croatian painter and engraver.

The five departments comprise a total of 18,993 exhibited items distributed in 51 various collections, including a lapidarium situated in the inner courtyard (atrium) of the Zrinski palace, with a large number of stone monuments exhibited in the open air.

Gallery

See also

 List of museums in Croatia
 Long Night of Museums

External links 
 Official website of the Međimurje County Museum
 Official website of the Croatian Museum Documentation Center

Museums in Croatia
Tourist attractions in Međimurje County
Museums established in 1954
History of Čakovec
1954 establishments in Croatia
Buildings and structures in Čakovec